Union Cemetery, also known as South Elm Street Cemetery, is a historic cemetery located at Greensboro, Guilford County, North Carolina. The cemetery for African-Americans was established in 1882.  Union retains 97 gravemarkers with death dates from 1882 to 1940.  The majority of the markers date between 1901 and 1917, when the city of Greensboro closed the cemetery.

It was listed on the National Register of Historic Places in 1993.

References

External links
 

African-American history of North Carolina
Cemeteries on the National Register of Historic Places in North Carolina
1882 establishments in North Carolina
Buildings and structures in Greensboro, North Carolina
National Register of Historic Places in Guilford County, North Carolina
African-American cemeteries